The World Blitz Chess Championship 2021 is the 2021 edition of the annual chess tournament held by FIDE to determine the world champion in chess played under blitz time controls. Since 2012, FIDE has held the World Rapid and Blitz Championships at a joint tournament. Originally planned to be held in Nur-Sultan, Kazakhstan, new coronavirus restrictions introduced by the Kazakh government prompted FIDE to change the location of the tournament to Warsaw, Poland.

The event took place at the Narodowy Stadium in Warsaw between 29 and 30 December 2021, using a Swiss-system with 21 rounds for the open tournament and 17 rounds for the women's tournament. Players eligible to participate must either be rated at least 2550 Elo (2250 Elo for women) in a FIDE rating list during 2021, or be a reigning national champion. Time controls for the tournament are 3+2, meaning each player initially starts with 3 minutes and gains 2 seconds increment with each move.

Participants 
179 players took part in the open tournament, and 105 in the women's tournament.

Prize Fund 
The prize fund for both the open's and women's tournament is shown below. In case of a tie (except for first place) all prize money is shared between the players. Players outside the brackets do not receive any prize money. All amounts are in USD.

Open tournament:

1st place: $60,000

2nd place: $50,000

3rd place: $40,000

4th place: $30,000

5th place: $25,000

6th place: $22,000

7th place: $18,000

8th place: $14,000

9th place: $11,000

10th place: $8,000

11th-16th places: $5,000

17th-25th places: $3,000

26th-35th places: $1,500

Total: $350,000

Women's tournament:

1st place: $40,000

2nd place: $30,000

3rd place: $20,000

4th place: $15,000

5th place: $10,000

6th place: $7,000

7th place: $6,000

8th place: $5,000

9th place: $4,000

10th place: $3,000

11th-15th places: $2,000

Total: $150,000

Schedule 
The opening ceremony took place on Saturday 25 December. Start times are approximate as all matches in the previous round must finish before the next round can commence. All times are CET.

Tiebreak Regulations 

For players who finish on the same score, final position is determined by the following tie-breaks, in order:

1. Buchholz Cut 1 (the sum of the scores of each of the opponents of a player but reduced by the lowest score of the opponents)

2. Buchholz (the sum of the scores of each of the opponents of a player)

3. Average Rating of Opponents Cut 1 (average rating of opponents excluding the lowest rated opponent)

4. The results of individual games between tied players

5. Drawing of lots

If two or more players are tied for any position other than first, the above mentioned tiebreak system shall decide the ranking of the tied players.

If two or more players are tied for first, the top two players who finished the highest on the above mentioned tiebreaks shall play a two game mini match with the time control of 3+2 (with colours of the first game drawn) to decide the winner. If the score is tied 1-1, the players continue to play single 3+2 games until one of the players has won one game (the player who finished highest on the above mentioned tiebreaks shall have the white pieces for the first game and the colours will alternate from the next game).

COVID-19 impacts tournament 
The 2021 World Blitz Chess Championship was held in the Polish capital Warsaw, a day after the longer time-format World Rapid Chess Championship finished in the same venue, after Kazakhstan pulled out of hosting duties due to the spread of the omicron variant.

The event was disrupted when some players tested positive for the coronavirus and had to withdraw from the tournament. Among them was Hikaru Nakamura, one of the leading contenders to take the title. 

French star Maxime Vachier-Lagrave ultimately walked away with the men's blitz title.

Open tournament results 
The following table lists all participants, with the results from the 21 rounds. They are ranked according to the results, taking into account the tie-breaks.

Notation: "1 (W 168)" indicates a win (1 point) with white pieces (W) against player of rank 168 (Michał Krasenkow).

Three players (Maxime Vachier-Lagrave, Jan-Krzysztof Duda, and Alireza Firouzja) were tied for first after 21 rounds. Among these, the two players with the highest Buchholz Cut 1 score (Vachier-Lagrave and Duda) played a title play-off to decide the winner. Vachier-Lagrave won the match 2:1 to become World Blitz Champion.

Women's tournament results 
The following table lists all participants, with the results from the 17 rounds. They are ranked according to the results, taking into account the tie-breaks.

Notation: "1 (B 56)" indicates a win (1 point) with black pieces (B) against player of rank 56 (Govhar Beydullayeva). The first tiebreak (labeled BC1) is the Buchholz Cut 1 score, the second tiebreak (labeled BS) is the Buchholz score, and the third tiebreak (labelled AROC1) is the average rating of opponents cut 1.

Notes

References 

World Blitz Chess Championship
2021 in chess
2021 in Polish sport
December 2021 sports events in Europe
Sports competitions in Warsaw
Chess in Poland